Leo De Crignis (born 12 July 1952) is an Italian ski jumper. He competed in the normal hill and large hill events at the 1976 Winter Olympics.

References

External links
 

1952 births
Living people
Italian male ski jumpers
Olympic ski jumpers of Italy
Ski jumpers at the 1976 Winter Olympics
Sportspeople from Udine